Senator Tweedy may refer to:

Alfred Tweedy (1880–?), Connecticut State Senate
Samuel Tweedy (1776–1868), Connecticut State Senate

See also
Senator Tweed (disambiguation)